Sleepless Night is a 2011 action thriller film directed and co-written by Frédéric Jardin. The film premiered in 2011 at the Toronto International Film Festival, and has received positive reviews from critics.

Plot
The film stars Tomer Sisley as Vincent, a police detective who plans to rob a pair of drug couriers when he finds that the cocaine he has is owned by nightclub owner and drug dealer Jose Marciano (Serge Riaboukine). Marciano kidnaps Vincent's son with the demand that he will be returned if his cocaine is returned. Just as Vincent finalizes the deal, he finds that his cocaine has vanished. The rest of the story focuses on him finding an alternate way to save his son.

Production 
Actor Tomer Sisley took the role immediately after reading the script. Sisley performed all his own stunts in the film, stating "I think that it is always better for the movie because it allows him [Frédéric Jardin] to put the camera wherever he wants."

The dance club in the film was built for the film. As a requirement of being a joint Belgian-French-Luxembourgian production, the film had to be partially shot in these locations having the dance club scene shot in Belgium and the kitchen and parking scenes shot in Luxembourg. For the fight scene in the kitchen, director Jardin desired "a fight that would be interesting for people who don’t like fights in films. Not just for crazy people who like kung-fu movies." Sisley was familiar with martial arts and boxing and jujitsu worked on the choreography for the fight scene before having a location or the scene.

Release 
Sleepless Night premiered at the 2011 Toronto International Film Festival. It was also shown at the 2012 Tribeca Film Festival. In September 2011, Warner Bros. Studios bought the rights for an American remake. The film was released in France on November 11, 2011. The film was the 15th highest-grossing film in France on its opening week and grossed a total of $298,383.

Tribeca Film purchased the American rights to the film for theatrical and video-on-demand distribution.

Reception 
Sleepless Night was received very well by critics on its original release. The film ranking website Rotten Tomatoes reported that 97% of critics had given the film positive reviews, based upon a sample of 32 review with an average score of 7.53/10. At Metacritic, which assigns a normalized rating out of 100 to reviews from mainstream critics, the film has received an average score of 75, based on 11 reviews.

Adaptations 
Two remakes were announced in 2015, an American adaptation titled, Sleepless, starring Jamie Foxx and Michelle Monaghan with Swiss director, Baran bo Odar, attached to the project, and a Tamil adaptation titled Thoongaa Vanam, starring Kamal Haasan directed by Rajesh M. Selva, a former assistant in the actor's directorial ventures. A Hindi adaptation will star Shahid Kapoor and be directed by Ali Abbas Zafar.

References

External links 
 
 

2011 films
2011 action thriller films
French action thriller films
Belgian action thriller films
Luxembourgian thriller films
2010s French-language films
French-language Belgian films
2010s French films